The following is a timeline of the presidency of Donald Trump during the first quarter of 2019, from January 1 to March 31, 2019. To navigate quarters, see timeline of the Donald Trump presidency.

Overview

The first quarter of 2019 began with the continuing government shutdown which had begun on December 22; it lasted until January 25.

Public opinion

Timeline

January 2019

February 2019

March 2019

See also
Presidential transition of Donald Trump
First 100 days of Donald Trump's presidency
List of executive actions by Donald Trump
List of presidential trips made by Donald Trump (international trips)

References

2019 Q1
Presidency of Donald Trump
January 2019 events in the United States
February 2019 events in the United States
March 2019 events in the United States
2019 timelines
Political timelines of the 2010s by year
Articles containing video clips